George Ryan Bingham  (born March 31, 1981) is an American singer, songwriter, guitarist and actor whose music spans multiple genres. He is currently based in Los Angeles. As of 2019, Bingham has released six studio albums and one live album, the last four of which were released under his own label, Axster Bingham Records.

Originally from Hobbs, New Mexico, Bingham grew up across the Southwestern United States. He joined the rodeo circuit as a bull rider in his teens. Bingham learned music on a guitar gifted to him by his mother at age 16, initially playing after rodeos for his friends. Eventually, he began playing in small bars and honky tonks across the West, landing him in Los Angeles. Bingham signed his first record deal with Lost Highway Records (UMG) in 2007.

After receiving critical acclaim for his first two studio releases on Lost Highway Records, 2007's Mescalito and 2009's Roadhouse Sun, Bingham went on to collaborate with Grammy-winning producer T Bone Burnett on the soundtrack for the 2009 acclaimed film Crazy Heart, including notably cowriting and performing the film's award-winning theme song, "The Weary Kind". The title track earned Bingham an Academy Award, Golden Globe Award, and Critics' Choice Award for "Best Song" in 2010, as well as a Grammy Award for "Best Song Written for a Motion Picture, Television or Other Visual Media" in 2011. The Americana Music Association also honored Bingham with the organization's top award in 2010 as "Artist of the Year".

Bingham's most recent album, American Love Song, was released on February 15, 2019. A ballad from that album, "Wolves", was inspired in part by the March For Our Lives students who were dealing with grown men and women questioning their integrity on social media. The song was also featured on the TV series Yellowstone. Bingham sang "Wolves" as the series' character, Walker, whom he plays on the show.

In April 2019 Bingham partnered with Live Nation to launch his own music festival, The Western. The inaugural event took place over two days in Luckenbach, Texas.

Early life 
Bingham was born in Hobbs, New Mexico. His family relocated to the Midland–Odessa area of West Texas, before eventually moving to Houston. He attended high school primarily in Houston at Westfield High School.

Bingham's mother purchased his first guitar when he was 16 years old. Although he was fascinated by music, he left his guitar dormant in his closet. Roughly a year later, Bingham hitchhiked back west to Laredo, Texas, in hopes of landing a job with his father, carrying the guitar with him on the trip. Bingham's father enjoyed having neighbors over on their porch to drink beer, and one of them taught him a classical Mariachi song called "La Malaguena" in segments. Though he loved playing the song, it was the only one he would learn during his time in Laredo.

He relocated to Stephenville, Texas. There, he began learning more music while also riding on the rodeo team at Tarleton State University. It was in Stephenville that he would write arguably his most well-known hit "Southside Of Heaven" in a trailer house. He also began to play local gigs there, namely a local golf course and a few small bars.

While in Stephenville, Bingham had a friend who caught wind of a job in Paris, France, with the Wild West Show at the Disney Resort. He bought a one-way ticket with $100 in his pocket. Upon arrival, he was informed that the manager with whom he had a mutual friend was no longer with the company, and he found himself stranded with his guitar and old rigging bag from his rodeo days. Luckily, he found some friends-of-friends within the Disney programs and began playing music in local parks for tips.

Eventually, he saved enough money to get back to Texas and moved in with a rodeo buddy near Fort Worth. His friend had a brother (Matthew "Papa" Smith) that cut hair during the day and played drums as a hobby. After an introduction and impromptu gig at an empty bar in Fort Worth, he and Papa would go on to be the founding members of Ryan Bingham and the Dead Horses. Marc Ford of the Black Crowes was one of the few people in the bar that night. He approached Bingham after the gig with an offer to record an album.

Career 
After issuing self-released "Wishbone Saloon" and "Dead Horses", the latter distributed by Lone Star Music, Bingham was signed to Lost Highway Records, which issued his first major label debut with Mescalito on October 2, 2007, produced by former Black Crowes guitarist Marc Ford. Texas Music Magazine has opined that Bingham "talks and sings with a whiskey-and-cigarette throat that screams hard living. Hard in a way that can make a 29-year-old sound like a 50-year-old Tom Waits." Bingham spent several years on the rodeo circuit. He began bull riding in his late teens.

Bingham's former band, The Dead Horses, was composed of Matthew "Papa" Smith (drums), Corby Schaub (guitar and mandolin) and Marc Ford's son Elijah (bass). The bass player on Mescalito was Jeb Venable (a.k.a. Jeb Stuart), with Joe Allen credited as well, plus a contribution from John Bazz on upright bass. Bingham appeared with the Drive-by Truckers on Austin City Limits in October 2007. The first single from Mescalito, titled "Southside of Heaven", was released on November 30, 2007. The second single was entitled "Bread and Water".

On June 2, 2009, Ryan Bingham and The Dead Horses released their second studio album titled Roadhouse Sun via Lost Highway Records. It was once again produced by Marc Ford.

Bingham performed two songs for the soundtrack of the movie Crazy Heart, including "I Don't Know" and the theme song, "The Weary Kind". The song was co-written by Bingham and producer, T Bone Burnett. Bingham also played a small role in the film. On January 17, 2010, Bingham was awarded the Golden Globe for Best Original Song for "The Weary Kind". The song also won the 2010 Academy Award for Best Original Song, the 2010 Grammy award for Best Song Written for a Motion Picture, Television or Other Visual Media, as well as Song of the Year at the 9th Annual Americana Music Association awards.

Bingham rejoined with his band the Dead Horses to release their third studio album, Junky Star, on August 31, 2010. The album debuted in the Top 20 on the Billboard 200 Chart & in the Top 10 on the Billboard Rock Album Chart, making Junky Star Bingham's highest charting and most successful release to date.

In 2012, Bingham parted ways with the Dead Horses and record label Lost Highway Records to release his fourth studio album, Tomorrowland, on his own Axster Bingham Records label. Bingham co-produced the album with musician/producer Justin Stanley. The first single released from Tomorrowland was "Heart of Rhythm". Both the single and the official lyric video debuted on Americansongwriter.com on July 30, 2012. Bingham's second Tomorrowland single "Guess Who's Knockin" debuted on rollingstone.com on September 6, 2012. The official music video for "Guess Who's Knocking" premiered on pastmagazine.com October 4, 2012.

In 2013, Bingham's song "For Anyone's Sake" appeared in the closing credits of the feature film Joe, starring Nicolas Cage. Bingham wrote the song for the film, and it was released as part of the film's original soundtrack in April 2014. In the same year, Bingham also wrote and recorded "Until I'm One With You", the theme song for FX TV drama series The Bridge. The song is Bingham's first screen track since his Academy Award win for best theme song in 2010. "Until I'm One With You" was released as a digital single on Bingham's own Axster Bingham Records label on June 25, 2013.

In 2014 Bingham starred opposite Imogen Poots in the independent film A Country Called Home, directed and co-written by his wife, Anna Axster. Bingham also wrote and recorded the film's title track "A Country Called Home". The song was released digitally through Bingham's own label, Axster Bingham Records, on May 6, 2016.

Bingham's fifth studio album Fear and Saturday Night was recorded mostly live at Plyrz Studio outside of Los Angeles, California. The album was co-produced by Jim Scott and released through Axster Bingham Records on January 20, 2015. The album's first single "Radio" was released on December 9, 2014. In a 2016 interview with Rolling Stone magazine Bingham shared, "'Radio' is a song I wrote about the thoughts, memories, and emotions that roll through my mind. The radio that's constantly playing in your head, night and day."

On August 6, 2016, Bingham recorded his first live album, Ryan Bingham Live, at Whitewater Amphitheater in New Braunfels, Texas. The album was released on October 21, 2016. The entire Whitewater Amphitheater show was also filmed and streamed live by Amazon Music.

Bingham released a song titled "Back By the River" on The Musical Mojo of Dr. John: A Celebration of Mac and his Music, in 2016.

In 2018–2020, Bingham has a guest role in the contemporary Western television show, Yellowstone, as Walker, an itinerant ranch hand.

In December 2018, Bingham announced that he would be releasing his sixth studio album American Love Song in February 2019.

In March 2020, Bingham began posting various covers and released songs on his Youtube channel in a series known as the Cantina Sessions throughout the COVID-19 Pandemic, he continued such until the end of 2020.

Reception 
Bingham has appeared as a guest on Bob Harris's Country Show on the BBC's Radio 2. Daryl Easlea, writing for the BBC's folk and country review, said: "Bingham will be one of the names to drop in 2008, with an album that sounds as if it's been unearthed from 1972."

Rolling Stone magazine gave Mescalito three out of five stars and wrote that Bingham "earns his sepia-toned album cover with a dusty wood-and-steel sound, and despite being twenty-five, sings like Steve Earle's dad."

PopMatters review of Tomorrowland awarded the album with 8 out of 10 stars. Greg M. Scwartz, writing for PopMatters wrote, that "The one-time pro rodeo rider turned Texas troubadour has blues, country, and Americana influences that are certainly still there. But at his core, Bingham has always been a rock 'n' roller and Tomorrowland features him rocking at his best."

Tomorrowland was also reviewed by Nico Isaac from Paste (magazine). Isaac wrote: "Tomorrowland is like a good, ol' fashioned rock anthem of kiss-my-asschaps autonomy... One thing's for sure Tomorrowland- the album and the red-blooded, rattlesnake-eating rebellious attitude—is no place for the weary kind."

Personal life 

Ryan's mother drank herself to death and his father committed suicide. Bingham's "Never Far Behind" from his Tomorrowland album is about his parents.

He announced at his performance in Austin, Texas, on March 5, 2015, that he and his wife were expecting their first child in the summer of 2015. Bingham's song "Broken Heart Tattoo" from Fear and Saturday Night is a reflection about what he would like to say to his unborn child.

On June 29, 2021, Bingham filed for divorce from his wife, Anna Axster, after 12 years of marriage. In September 2021 it was revealed that the couple's former Topanga Canyon home was sold for $2.45 million. The home was originally purchased by the couple in 2013 for $1.36 million. Bingham and Axster have three children together.

Discography

Studio albums

Live albums

Extended plays

Singles

Other charted songs

Music videos

Filmography

Film 
For film roles, he is credited as Ryan Bingham unless otherwise noted.

Television

Awards and nominations

Academy Awards

Americana Music Association

Critics' Choice Movie Awards

Golden Globe Awards

Grammy Awards

Satellite Awards

Screen Actors Guild Awards

World Soundtrack Awards

References

External links 

Bingham's official website
Review of Roadhouse Sun from CountryMusicPride.com
Los Angeles Times article on Bingham
Interview with LoneStarMusic.com

Ryan Bingham | "Crazy Heart" Soundtrack – A Guitar Felt A Lot Better In My Hands Than A Shovel | The European Magazine

1981 births
American male singer-songwriters
American country rock singers
American country singer-songwriters
American rock guitarists
American male guitarists
American rock singers
Singer-songwriters from Texas
Golden Globe Award-winning musicians
Best Original Song Academy Award-winning songwriters
Living people
Musicians from Austin, Texas
Musicians from New Braunfels, Texas
Country musicians from Texas
Lost Highway Records artists
People from Hobbs, New Mexico
Songwriters from New Mexico
Guitarists from New Mexico
Country musicians from New Mexico
Guitarists from Texas
Bull riders
21st-century American guitarists
21st-century American male singers
21st-century American singers
Thirty Tigers artists